Stenanthemum pomaderroides is a species of flowering plant in the family Rhamnaceae and is endemic to the southwest of Western Australia. It is an erect shrub with densely hairy young stems, egg-shaped leaves with the narrower end towards the base, and cream-coloured clusters of 10 to 30 tube-shaped flowers.

Description
The upper surface of the leaves has star-shaped hairs or is glabrous, the lower surface with shaggy, greyish hairs. The flowers are cream-coloured and borne in clusters of 10 to 30, often with white floral leaves at the base.

Taxonomy and naming
This species was first formally described in 1848 by Siegfried Reissek who gave it the name Cryptandra pomaderroides in Novarum Stirpium Decades. In 1858, Reissek changed the name to Stenanthemum pomaderroides in the journal Linnaea. The specific epithet (pomaderroides) means "pomaderris-like".

Distribution and habitat
Stenanthemum pomaderroides grows in shrubland and woodland, usually in rocky places, between the Murchison River at Kalbarri and Wyalkatchem, in the Avon Wheatbelt and Geraldton Sandplains bioregions of south-western Western Australia.

References

pomaderroides
Rosales of Australia
Flora of Western Australia
Plants described in 1848